Manuel Valls i Gorina (21 July 1920 – 1984) was a Spanish composer, pianist, music critic, and music educator.

Valls was born in Badalona. He was a first cousin of painter Xavier Valls, himself the father of former French Prime Minister Manuel Valls. He studied at the University of Barcelona and the Conservatori Superior de Música del Liceu. At the Liceu he was mentored by Aita Donostia with whom he studied music theory, music composition, and orchestration. He became a successful composer writing symphonic works, chamber music, choral music, operas, art songs, and songs for solo piano. For many years he taught composition at the University of Barcelona and wrote music reviews for El País..  He died in Barcelona.

Personal papers of Manuel Valls i Gorina are preserved in the Biblioteca de Catalunya.

Manuel Valls is the composer of the music of "El Cant del Barça", the official anthem of FC Barcelona.

Selected works
Estudio de danza en 5/8 
Preludio para piano 
Concierto de guitarra y orquesta 
Tocata per a piano 
Seis canciones del Alto Duero para voz y piano 
 Fantasías en forma de concierto para flauta solista y cuerda 
La Mare de Déu (SATB chorus) 
Poemes de Patrícia: Renaixença, Món, Nit (SATB chorus)
Primera historia de Esther (1955 opera) 
CAL 33-33, o El bon samaritá (1967 opera)

References

Sources
Música de tota mena. Barcelona, ed. Clivis, 1982. .

External links 

 Personal papers of Manuel Valls i Gorina in the Biblioteca de Catalunya

1920 births
1984 deaths
20th-century classical composers
20th-century Spanish musicians
20th-century Spanish male musicians
Composers from Catalonia
Opera composers from Catalonia
Male opera composers
Spanish classical composers
Spanish male classical composers
Spanish opera composers
Spanish music critics
Conservatori Superior de Música del Liceu alumni
University of Barcelona alumni